Benjamin Penfield Mead (September 21, 1849 – March 19, 1913) was Connecticut State Comptroller from 1895 to 1899, a member of the Connecticut House of Representatives representing New Canaan from 1885 to 1889, and a member of the Connecticut Senate representing the 12th District from 1889 to 1892.

He was the son of Benjamin Close Mead and Mary Elizabeth Rich of Greenwich.

In 1902, he was a delegate to the Connecticut Constitutional Convention. He died in 1913 after an illness.

References

 Commemorative biographical record of Fairfield County, Connecticut
 Taylor's Souvenir of the Capitol
 Evening Post Annual - Biographical Sketches

1849 births
1913 deaths
Connecticut city council members
Connecticut Comptrollers
Republican Party Connecticut state senators
Republican Party members of the Connecticut House of Representatives
People from Greenwich, Connecticut
People from New Canaan, Connecticut